WRUM (100.3 FM) is a commercial radio station in Orlando, Florida, known as "Rumba 100.3."  It airs a Spanish-language radio format featuring Latin pop, Reggaeton and Tropical music, and is owned by iHeartMedia. The studios and offices are on Maitland Center Parkway in Maitland.

WRUM has an effective radiated power (ERP) of 100,000 watts.  The transmitter is in Bithlo, off Fort Christmas Road (Route 420).

WRUM broadcasts using the HD radio hybrid format.  The HD2 subchannel carries a bilingual CHR format, known as "Mega 97.1."  The subchannel feeds an FM translator at 97.1 MHz.  The HD3 subchannel carries a Spanish news/talk format, simulcasting WRSO.

History
The station signed on in 1950 as WKIS-FM, originally simulcasting WKIS (now WYGM).  The two stations were owned by Central Florida Broadcasting and were network affiliates of NBC.

In 1971, the simulcast ended as WKIS and WKIS-FM were sold to separate companies, with the FM station acquired by the Shamrock Development Company.  The new management installed a progressive rock format, switching the call sign to WDIZ.  Over time, the station's playlist focused on the top-selling albums and rock artists, as the station shifted to album-oriented rock.

In 1996, after stunting with sounds of a department store that included occasional talking, typewriter noises, and telephones ringing, the station switched to all oldies as WSHE.San Antonio-based Clear Channel Communications (now iHeartMedia) acquired the station in 1997. On February 28, 2004, after stunting with the last two minutes of "Hey Jude" by The Beatles in a loop for only a single weekend, the station's call letters were then switched to WEBG.

In 2005, the station flipped to a Spanish-language tropical music format, although over time, Latin pop and Reggaeton would be mixed into the playlist.

WRUM-HD2
On April 19, 2017, WRUM-HD2 launched a bilingual CHR format, branded as Boom 97 Uno.  It was simulcast on FM translators at 97.1 FM: W246BT in Clermont (about 20 miles west of Orlando), and W246CK in Kissimmee (a few miles south of Orlando). However, due to a trademark claim by Radio One (which uses the "Boom" brand for its classic hip hop stations), the HD2 subchannel and FM translators were rebranded as Oi2 97 Uno (pronounced "Oidos") on May 4, 2017.  On February 8, 2018, WRUM-HD2 became Mega 97.1.

Translators

References

External links

RUM
RUM
IHeartMedia radio stations
Radio stations established in 1950
1950 establishments in Florida
Tropical music radio stations